McMaken is a surname. Notable people with the surname include:

Rob McMaken (fl. 2001–), American musician
William Vance McMaken (1857–1923), United States Army general

See also
McMakin